Danville State Hospital in Danville, Pennsylvania is a mental health facility operated by the Pennsylvania Department of Public Welfare. It was Pennsylvania's third public facility to house the mentally ill and disabled.

History
Danville State Hospital for the mentally ill, located one mile (1.6 km) southeast of Danville, Pennsylvania, opened in 1872 as the "State Hospital for the Insane at Danville". The hospital's Main Building, which was designed by John McArthur, Jr., was a Kirkbride Plan hospital building. By September 30, 1873, 138 male and 72 female patients had been admitted for treatment. The land on which Danville State Hospital stands today was originally a tract owned by pioneer Daniel Montgomery, co-founder (with his father) of Danville and for whom the town was named. The  were bought for $26,600 and Danville citizens backed the project by contributing $16,123.12 of that total.

Nine years after the new hospital opened its doors to patients it experienced a large scale fire which completely gutted the interior of the administration section, all of the female wards, and part of the male wards. The fire happened on March 5, 1881, between 8 and 9 pm on a Saturday evening. Reportedly, the fire was said to have originated from an explosion of gas in one of the rooms on the second floor of the female wing. Rebuilding the hospital would take another five years. During the rebuilding, the male wards that were not damaged by the fire remained open.

Between 1900 and the 1950s, additional land was purchased and many new buildings were constructed. The hospital received full approval of the Central Inspection Board of the American Psychiatric Association for excellence in patient care. The patient population showed a steady increase up to November 1955, when the figure reached 2,801. Since that time, a gradual planned reduction has occurred. As a result, the census in 1968 was 1,899, and on June 30, 2002, the hospital census stood at 147. This is in keeping with the modern philosophy of treating patients in the least restrictive setting. In 1976, a Long Term Care Facility (Licensed Nursing Home) was opened to address the needs of geriatric patients who no longer were considered to be in need of psychiatric care. The Long Term Care Facility closed on May 12, 1998.

Since 1985, this hospital has had full accreditation from JCAHO, Medicare, and Medical Assistance. The last JCAHO Survey was March 2003, and received a three-year accreditation.

As of January 31, 2008, Danville State Hospital had 163 patients.

Notable people
 Edith May (pseudonym of Anne Drinker; 1827–1903), American poet

See also

 Kirkbride Plan
 Danville, Pennsylvania
 List of hospitals in Pennsylvania

References

External links
 Official PA DHS Danville Website
 Danville State Hospital - History, past and present photos, and timeline.

Hospital buildings completed in 1872
Psychiatric hospitals in Pennsylvania
Hospitals established in 1872
Kirkbride Plan hospitals
Buildings and structures in Montour County, Pennsylvania
1872 establishments in Pennsylvania